The University of Illinois Press (UIP) is an American university press and is part of the University of Illinois system. Founded in 1918, the press publishes some 120 new books each year, plus 33 scholarly journals, and several electronic projects. Strengths include ethnic and multicultural studies, Lincoln and Illinois history, and the large and diverse series Music in American Life.

See also 

 List of English-language book publishing companies
 List of university presses
 Journals published by University of Illinois Press

References

External links 
 

1918 establishments in Illinois
Book publishing companies based in Illinois
Publishing companies established in 1918
Press
Illinois